Woman or Woman: Incorporating the Woman's Budget was a woman's magazine published in Sydney, Australia by Sungravure. It operated from 1934 to 1954. Issues originally cost three pence each.

References

1934 establishments in Australia
1954 disestablishments in Australia
Women's magazines published in Australia
Defunct magazines published in Australia
Magazines established in 1934
Magazines disestablished in 1954
Magazines published in Sydney